Mt. Olive Missionary Baptist Church No.1 is a historic Missionary Baptist church building in Mobile, Alabama.  The church was built in 1916 by the local African American community. It was added to the National Register of Historic Places on May 29, 2008, based on its architectural significance.

References

National Register of Historic Places in Mobile, Alabama
Churches on the National Register of Historic Places in Alabama
Churches in Mobile, Alabama
Baptist churches in Alabama
Churches completed in 1916
20th-century Baptist churches in the United States
African-American history in Mobile, Alabama